Metropolismania (known in Japan as Machi-ing Maker) is a PlayStation 2-only city-building game developed by Indi. The object of the game is to interact with NPCs in order to populate various towns. A sequel was announced by Natsume, titled Metropolismania 2 (Machi-ing Maker 2: Zoku Boku no Machi Zukuri in Japan). The title was released on August 28, 2007 in North America and in Japan on July 13, 2006 by D3 Publisher. Another sequel, Metropolismania 3, was released for the PlayStation Portable by D3 Publisher but in Japan only. Several titles under the name "Machi-Ing maker" have also been published for the Nintendo DS and the PlayStation 3.

Gameplay
There are various goals to complete in each of the five main scenarios. Goals always involve growing the town to a given population, and often ensuring that a percentage of the buildings are of a certain type, i.e. businesses, farms, or amusement facilities. There are also side stories that occur within each scenario, sometimes including bizarre instances involving smuggling rings, a cult, and even aliens. When all requirements for the scenario have been met, the player's boss will call to congratulate them and send a letter of resignation, allowing the player to move on to the next scenario.

Gameplay also centers heavily on interaction with the in-game characters. Each character has a friendship meter that increases or decreases based on interactions such as "gossip" and giving gifts. Relationship statuses are: "stranger," "know the face," "acquaintance," "friend," and "best friend." Introducing new citizens or solving complaints is often based on good friendship status with these characters.

Characters
There are several categories of characters in the game. Visually, characters within a category may have some variation, from the color of their hair to their clothing. Knowing personality types also aids the player in the game as certain conversational or "gossip" items more quickly increase the friendship meter. 

For Metropolismania 2, there are universal categories of character personality types in the game. Just as in the original, characters within a category may have some design variations, like clothing or hair color, but respond to specific "gossip" topics similarly.

Reception

Metropolismania received "mixed" reviews, while its sequel received "unfavorable" reviews, according to the review aggregation website Metacritic.

References

External links
 
 

2001 video games
2007 video games
City-building games
Nintendo DS games
PlayStation 2 games
PlayStation 2-only games
PlayStation 3 games
PlayStation Portable games
Kadokawa Dwango franchises
Ubisoft games
Video games developed in Japan
Xbox 360 games
Single-player video games